The Basel III: Finalising post-crisis reform standards, sometimes called Basel 3.1 or Basel IV, are changes to international standards for bank capital requirements that were agreed by the Basel Committee on Banking Supervision (BCBS) in 2017 and are due for implementation in January 2023. They amend the international banking standards known as the Basel Accords.  

The Basel Committee describes these changes as completing the Basel III reforms, published in 2010–11, and calls them "finalised Basel III post-crisis reforms". The UK Government calls the changes "Basel 3.1". Others have referred to them as Basel IV (sometimes including FRTB); however, the secretary general of Basel Committee said in a 2016 speech he did not view the changes as substantial enough to describe them in such a way. 

Critics of the reforms, in particular those from the banking industry, argue that the standards lead to a significant increase in capital requirements, when the stated intention of the Basel Committee was for the changes to the standards to be capital neutral in terms of their aggregate impact, although not necessarily neutral for individual banks.

History 
Basel III is an international regulatory framework for banks, developed by the Basel Committee on Banking Supervision (BCBS) in response to the financial crisis of 2007-08. It contains various rules on capital and liquidity requirements for banks. The 2017 reforms complement the initial Basel III. This set of rules was adopted on 7 December 2017 with an intended implementation date of January 2022 (including a phase-in period for the output floor until 2027). As the BCBS does not have the power to issue legally binding regulation, the Basel standards have to be implemented by national authorities.

The secretary general of the Basel Committee said, in a 2016 speech, that he did not believe the changes are substantial enough to warrant a new Roman numeral. The Basel Committee refer to only three Basel Accords.

In response to the COVID-19 pandemic, the BCBS agreed to delay implementation by one year until January 2023.

Requirements 
The reforms revise the standardised approach for credit risk (SA-CR), the internal ratings-based approach for credit risk (IRB), the credit valuation adjustment (CVA) framework, the calculation of operational risk RWAs, the leverage ratio, and introduce an aggregate output floor for risk weighted assets (RWAs).

The BCBS press release summarised the reforms as follows:
 a revised standardised approach for credit risk, which will improve the robustness and risk sensitivity of the existing approach;
 revisions to the internal ratings-based approach for credit risk, where the use of the most advanced internally modelled approaches for low-default portfolios will be limited;
 revisions to the credit valuation adjustment (CVA) framework, including the removal of the internally modelled approach and the introduction of a revised standardised approach;
 a revised standardised approach for operational risk, which will replace the existing standardised approaches and the advanced measurement approaches;
 revisions to the measurement of the leverage ratio and a leverage ratio buffer for global systemically important banks (G-SIBs), which will take the form of a Tier 1 capital buffer set at 50% of a G-SIB's risk-weighted capital buffer; and
 an aggregate output floor, which will ensure that banks' risk-weighted assets (RWAs) generated by internal models are no lower than 72.5% of RWAs as calculated by the Basel III framework's standardised approaches. Banks will also be required to disclose their RWAs based on these standardised approaches.
These reforms will take effect from January 2023, with exception of the output floor, which is phased in, taking full effect only on 1 January 2028.

Capital impact 
The standards are expected to increase capital requirements for British banks alone by £50bn. The average Common Equity Tier 1 (CET1) capital ratio for major European banks is estimated to fall by 0.9%, with the biggest impact on banks in Sweden and Denmark of 2.5–3%. The December 2020 assessment by the European Banking Authority (EBA) of the capital impact of implementing Basel 3.1 in the EU is an increase of 18.5% in minimum required capital with the impact for some national banking sectors forecast to be much higher (based on figures as of 31 December 2019).

Implementation
The Basel Committee set 1 January 2023 as the (revised) date for implementation of the new rules. However, in October 2021 the European Commission proposed an implementation date of 1 January 2025. In March 2022, the UK's Bank of England also announced that they will propose an implementation date of January 2025.

References

External links

 OECD: Thinking Beyond Basel III: Necessary Solutions for Capital and Liquidity
 https://www.bis.org/bcbs/publ/d424_inbrief.pdf
 https://www.bis.org/bcbs/publ/d424_hlsummary.pdf
 https://www.bis.org/bcbs/publ/d424.pdf

Bibliography
Ioannis Akkizidis, Lampros Kalyvas (2018). Basel IV Modelling: Implementation, Impact and Implications, Palgrave Macmillan. 

Bank regulation